What If Someone Is Watching Their T.V.? is the second studio album by the Screaming Females. Originally self-released in 2007, it was re-released on Don Giovanni Records in 2009 and later re-released again on October 4, 2011, this time on vinyl.

Track listing
All songs written by Screaming Females (Jarrett Dougherty, Mike "King Mike" Abbate, Marissa Paternoster).
 "Theme Song"  – 2:52
 "The Real Mothers"  – 3:03
 "Humanity Arranged"  – 4:01
 "Starve The Beat"  – 4:39
 "Little Anne"  – 1:46
 "Fun"  – 3:23
 "Limbs"  – 4:24
 "Pedro"  – 3:27
 "Mothership"  – 4:41
 "Boyfriend"  – 3:43

References

Screaming Females albums
Don Giovanni Records albums
2007 albums